Ripponden is a village and civil parish on the River Ryburn near Halifax in West Yorkshire, England. Historically it was part of the West Riding of Yorkshire. Its population was 6,412 at the time of the 2001 Census, and 7,421 in 2011.

Ripponden is the main settlement in a small group of villages (Barkisland, Ripponden, Rishworth and Soyland) whose citizens are represented on Ripponden Parish Council. The area is a substantial part of the Ryburn Ward, itself part of Calderdale metropolitan borough.

Ripponden and its villages were formerly served by the Rishworth branch line from Sowerby Bridge; Ripponden and Barkisland railway station closed to passengers in 1929 and the line was closed completely in 1958.

The area is of archaeological note as it is rich in neolithic and Bronze Age remains. At nearby Ringstone Edge can be found a small stone circle.

Ripponden is the terminus of the annual Sowerby Bridge Rushbearing Festival.

The village is on the route of the Calderdale Way, a  circular walk around the hills and valleys of Calderdale.

Ripponden Junior & Infant School has a capacity of 240 children ages 4 - 11.

The Old Bridge Inn in the village is the home of an annual pork pie competition. The Old Bridge, or Waterloo Bridge, near the Inn is on the old packhorse road through the village and is also known as the Packhorse Bridge.

On 6 July 2014, Stage 2 of the 2014 Tour de France, from York to Sheffield, passed through the village. On leaving Ripponden at the  point, riders undertook the third climb of the stage, the Category 3 Côte de Ripponden. The first rider over the top to claim two points in the King of the Mountains competition was Cyril Lemoine of Cofidis. The other point available was claimed by David De La Cruz Melgarejo.

Notable people
 James Walton, inventor and industrialist, born in Ripponden in 1803.
 Sir Norman Howard Bottomley, Air Chief Marshal of the RAF and Commander-in-Chief of RAF Bomber Command in 1945, was born in Ripponden in 1891.
 Nobel Prize–winning physicist Prof Richard Feynman was a regular visitor to the village in the 1960s-1980s, with his third wife who was born locally. He also spent significant time in nearby Mill Bank.

Sport
The village has a football team Ryburn United. Stones Cricket Club play near the village and are members of the Halifax Cricket League.

See also
Listed buildings in Ripponden

References

External links

Ripponden Parish Council
Ryburn Ward 2004 population statistics and maps
Ripponden In Bloom
St. Bartholomew's Church Ripponden
Ryburn Valley History Society
Sowerby Bridge Chronicle newspaper website

 
Villages in West Yorkshire
Civil parishes in West Yorkshire
Geography of Calderdale